Telephone numbers in Suriname are administered by the Surinamese government. Since 2017 the responsibility is at the ministry of Public Works, Transport and Communication and in the period of 1991 to 2017 of the ministry of Transport, Communication and Tourism. The International dialling code is +597. Suriname uses a number plan introduced in 2008.

Telephone numbering plan 
Suriname uses the following National Significant Numbers (NSN):
Minimum number length (excluding the country code): six digits.
Maximum number length (excluding the country code): seven digits.

The international dialling format is as follows:
Mobile: +597 XXX XXXX
Fixed: +597 XXX XXX

History
Until 1969, a system was used with 2-digit area codes and local numbers varying from 2 to 5 digits depending on the area. Around 1969/1970 this was changed to a closed numbering system with 5-digit numbers nationwide; a zero had to be dialled before the number. At that time, some areas were not automated yet.

Allocations

References

Suriname
Suriname communications-related lists
Telecommunications in Suriname